Next parliamentary elections will be held in Estonia by 7 March 2027 to elect all 101 members of the Riigikogu.

Electoral system 

The Riigikogu is made up of 101 seats and its representatives are elected by proportional representation in twelve multi-member constituencies. First, seats are to be filled in 12 constituencies of 5 to 16 seats depending on their population, and the remaining seats, known as "compensation seats", are allocated using the d'Hondt method to all parties that exceeded the 5% electoral threshold, to bring the results in terms of seats as close as possible to those of the vote of the population. Voters have the possibility of casting a preferential vote for one of the candidates on the list for which they are voting. If a candidate collects more preferential votes than the amount of the simple quotient in his constituency, they are declared elected even if the list for which they are candidate for fails to cross the 5% electoral threshold.

Seats by electoral district

Opinion polling

2023

References

External links
Estonian National Electoral Committee

Parliamentary elections in Estonia
Estonia
Estonian parliamentary election